Strange Music is an American independent record label specializing in hip hop music and founded by Tech N9ne and Travis O'Guin in 1999.

History
In 2009 Skatterman & Snug Brim fulfilled their commitment to Strange Music and left the label.

In 2010 Jay Rock signed a multi-album deal with Strange Music.

In 2011 Stevie Stone joined the label in March and Prozak in December.

In 2012 Strange Music signed the duo CES Cru, made up of rappers Ubiquitous and Godemis, in January and Slumerican rapper Rittz in August.

In 2014 Murs signed to Strange Music in February and Kutt Calhoun and Jay Rock left Strange Music in September.

In 2016 Chicago-based pop group AboveWaves signed to the label.

In 2018 Strange Music announced a new pop music subsidiary Strange Main in February, and Murs left in March after completing his contract.

In 2019 Krizz Kaliko announced his intentions of leaving the label on October 6, then signed a new contract on stage on October 20. However, Kaliko officially announced his departure from Strange in order to form his own label Ear House Inc. on May 15, 2021.

Subsidiaries 
Strange Music West was announced in 2009 with Dave Weiner, formerly of Priority Records and JCOR Entertainment, as Vice President. Weiner immediately signed Brotha Lynch Hung to the label.

Strange Lane Records was started in 2010 and signed Young Bleed as its first artist.

Strange Main, a pop music division, was announced in 2018 with former radio personality Ponch Hudgens as Executive Director and C.E.O. Travis O'Guin's daughter Mackenzie as its flagship artist.

It Goes Up Entertainment is a subsidiary of Strange Music that acts as a distribution company to other artists and their labels or independent projects. It was founded and launched in 2021. It currently distributes artists Saigon, Jelly Roll, Dax & ¡Mayday!

Roster

Current artists

Former artists

Discography

See also
 List of record labels

References

External links
 
 Music Blogs

2000 establishments in the United States
Hip hop record labels
American independent record labels
Hardcore hip hop record labels